My Stupid Heart is the ninth studio album release from American rock singer-songwriter Shawn Mullins.

Track listing 
 The Great Unknown
 It All Comes Down To Love
 Ferguson
 My Stupid Heart
 Roll On By
 Go And Fall
 Gambler's Heart
 Never Gonna Let Her Go
 Sunshine
 Pre-Apocalyptic Blues

References

External links 

2015 albums
Shawn Mullins albums